CHSC may refer to:

 Certified Health and Safety Consultant, a designation granted by the Canadian Society of Safety Engineering
 Cleveland Hearing & Speech Center, Ohio, US
 Coffs Harbour Senior College, New South Wales, Australia
 Committee on Home-School Co-operation, Hong Kong
 Community Human Services Corporation, Pittsburgh, Pennsylvania, US
 Canadian Home Shopping Channel, a former name of The Shopping Channel
 CHSC (AM), a radio station in St. Catharines, Ontario, Canada
 CHSC (Unity, Saskatchewan), a radio station in Canada 1923–1929